Whiston is a town and civil parish within the Metropolitan Borough of Knowsley in Merseyside, England. The population was 13,629 at the 2001 Census, increasing to 14,263 at the 2011 Census.

A new village, Halsnead Garden Village, was approved with government support in 2017 and will be located in the Halsnead area of the town. The new village will contain over 1,500 houses, a primary school, a country park, and various community and leisure facilities. Construction is estimated to cost around £270 million.

History
The first record of Whiston comes in 1245, being rendered as "Quistan" and being within the West Derby Hundred in Lancashire. Archeological evidence such as a neolithic polished hand-axe and mesolithic tool fragments suggest that the region was host to pre-historic settlement up to 12,000 years, ago while other archaeological finds include remnants of a Roman tile workshop in nearby Tarbock and a medieval shovel head.

The main industry of Whiston's earlier documented history is agriculture, with the first recorded mill in the area being held by local lord Henry Travers from 1190. By 1521, the first documentation of coal mining is made, which would in time become Whiston's primary industry. By 1700, the coalfields of Whiston, Prescot, and Sutton were producing 25,000-50,000 tonnes of coal annually, and this would only increase as the Industrial Revolution progressed and the Whiston area became host to tens of collieries over the 18th and 19th Centuries.

The Church of St. Nicholas on Windy Arbor Road was consecrated on 30 July 1868. It hosts a war memorial, designed by Sir Giles Gilbert Scott, which was struck by lightning in 1928. The memorial was replaced in 1932.

Whiston was previously host to Halsnead Hall, a neoclassical manor that housed the Willis family, chief landholders in Whiston from 1684 until the auctioning of their estate in 1929. Halsnead Hall, demolished in 1932 and now the site of Halsnead static caravan park, was designed by the renowned architect Sir John Soane. Before its demolition, it was the sole example of Soane's work in either Lancashire or Cheshire.

Governance
Prior to boundary changes in 2016, Whiston consisted of the Whiston North and Whiston South wards of the Metropolitan Borough of Knowsley. The North and South wards were separated by the Liverpool to Manchester Railway, which runs directly through the town. The former borough wards of North and South are still used in the form of Town Council wards, but for the purposes of Borough representation, Whiston elects three councillors via the combined ward of Whiston and Cronton.

Whiston lent its name to and was formerly the headquarters of the Whiston Rural District within the County of Lancashire before the Local Government Act 1972. Today, Whiston Town Council oversees parish level administration.

Transport
Whiston is crossed by the historic Liverpool to Manchester Railway, and is served by Whiston railway station with services to Liverpool and Manchester, operated by Northern. Local bus routes to Runcorn, Liverpool, St Helens and Huyton also serve the town. These are operated by, among other smaller local providers, Stagecoach and Arriva.

Health
St Helens and Knowsley Teaching Hospitals NHS Trust operates Whiston Hospital. The hospital supports the primary maternity department for the Knowsley and St Helens boroughs, alongside a regional Burns and Plastic Surgery Unit serving North West England, North Wales and the Isle of Man. The Trust is a member organisation of the teaching hospital system partnered with the University of Liverpool, Liverpool John Moores University and Edge Hill University.

Industries
Local industry includes Glen Dimplex Home Appliances, producing kitchen appliances and employing approximately 1,000 people.

Education

Primary education
St Luke's Catholic Primary School
Halsnead Primary School
Whiston Willis Primary School
St Leo's & Southmead Catholic Primary School

Secondary education
In 2010, two of Whiston's secondary schools were closed and redeveloped under the Labour Party governments 'Building Schools for the Future' scheme. This £150 million programme created seven new 'Centres for Learning' to replace the ten existing secondary schools within the Knowsley borough.

Knowsley Higher Side Comprehensive School, Cumber Lane.
Constructed in 1964, Knowsley Higher Side Comprehensive School was one of the first comprehensive schools in the local area, purpose built under the Labour Party's education reforms to formally abolish the tripartite system of education; to amalgamate grammar, technical and secondary modern schools into one appropriately named Comprehensive System. 
In March 2010, after serving the local area for 46 years, Higher Side Comprehensive School was permanently closed and subsequently demolished to make way for the new St Edmund Arrowsmith Catholic Centre for Learning which was constructed on vacant land behind Higher Side's main buildings. The land on which Higher Side once stood now serves as a car park and recreational area for staff and pupils of the new St Edmund Arrowsmith.

The only remaining building of the former Higher Side School site is the former Whiston & Prescot City Learning Centre (CLC), now St Edmund Arrowsmith Science Hub. The building was originally constructed and opened in 2000. Pupils of the school who were still enrolled at Higher Side at the time its closure were transferred to its replacement Knowsley Park Centre for Learning (now The Prescot School) based on Knowsley Park Lane, Prescot.

St Edmund Arrowsmith Catholic Academy, Whiston, Cumber Lane.
Closed, relocated and rebuilt behind the former Knowsley Higher Side Comprehensive School on Cumber Lane. Renamed as 'St Edmund Arrowsmith Catholic Centre for Learning' for a while. The original St Edmund Arrowsmith Building on Scotchbarn Lane was retained for several years and redeveloped as a youth training academy, but has also since been demolished.

Notable people
Alan Allport, historian
Peter Briggs, screenwriter
Melanie C, singer, "Sporty Spice" of the Spice Girls
Martin Dwyer, jockey
Steven Gerrard, footballer 
Steve Hampson, rugby league player 
Jamie Harrison, cricketer 
Craig Hignett, footballer
Martin Kelly, footballer
David Leather, cricketer
Stuart Maconie, radio presenter and author
Kym Marsh, actress and singer
Conor McAleny, footballer
Dave McCabe, lead singer and guitarist of The Zutons
Natalie McCool, songwriter and musician
Rachel McDowall, actress
James Roby, rugby league player
Willy Russell, screenwriter and playwright
Matty Smith, rugby league player
William Snowden, cricketer
Mark Ward, footballer

See also
 List of hospitals in England
 Listed buildings in Whiston, Merseyside

References

External links
 Whiston Town Council
 History of Whiston at Knowsley Archives

Towns and villages in the Metropolitan Borough of Knowsley
Civil parishes in Merseyside